Ictidodon is an extinct genus of therocephalian therapsids from the Late Permian of South Africa. The type species Ictidodon agilis was named by South African paleontologist Robert Broom in 1925. Broom classified Ictidodon in the Scaloposauridae, a group of small-bodied therocephalians that are now thought to be juvenile forms of larger therocephalians. Ictidodon and many other scaloposaurids are now classified as basal members of the clade Baurioidea.

References

Lopingian synapsids of Africa
Baurioids
Therocephalia genera
Lopingian genus first appearances
Lopingian genus extinctions